The War Amps is a Canadian registered nonprofit organization, established in 1918 to meet the needs of war amputees. The charity provides financial and advisory services to those who have lost a limb or total eyesight in military service during war and to provide similar services to Canadians who have undergone amputations.

Today, the Association continues to serve them, and all Canadian amputees, including children. The Child Amputee (CHAMP) Program provides financial assistance for artificial limbs, regional seminars, and peer support. It is funded solely through public support of the Key Tag and Address Label Service and does not receive government grants. Through CHAMP, the War Amps tradition of “amputees helping amputees” will continue long into the future.

History
The organization began as The Amputation Club of British Columbia. However, it later became The War Amputations of Canada, eventually shortening to the War Amps.

Services
Key Tags:  Beginning in 1946 war amputees were given work by producing key tags. In 1972, this program began to serve year-round employment for disabled staff. If a pair of keys are found with a War Amps tag, giving them to either police or the postal service will allow the keys to come back to their rightful owners. War Amps reports that the key service has returned more than a million lost keys.
Operation Legacy: A program designed to preserving and commemorate Canada’s military heritage by teaching youth about Canadian wartime history.
Documentaries: War Amps has produced a number of documentaries about Canada’s military heritage.

Notable contributors
Adrian Anantawan, active member and spokesperson
Mary Riter Hamilton painted for 'The Gold Stripe', a collection of work chronicling the Great War with all proceeds going to War Amps.
Mark Arendz, Canadian Paralympian

References

External links
 

Organizations based in Ottawa
Canadian veterans' organizations
Charities based in Canada
Amputee organizations
Disability organizations based in Canada
1918 establishments in Ontario